Julie Nihill (born 1957 in Melbourne) is an Australian actress, best known for her 13-year role as Chris Riley on the police drama Blue Heelers (1994–2006).

Biography
Nihill made her television debut in I Can Jump Puddles (1981) and her film debut in Careful, He Might Hear You (1983). This led to her first lead role in the ABC TV movie Every Move She Makes (for which Nihill received a Penguin Award) and the miniseries Bodyline, in which Nihill played Jessie Bradman, Sir Donald Bradman's wife.

Nihill became a household face in 1994 when she was cast as publican and local Councillor Chris Riley on the police drama Blue Heelers. Nihill was one of only two actors (the other being John Wood) to star in the series for its entire run.

Nihill played guest roles in television programs including Prisoner: Cell Block H, Sons and Daughters, A Country Practice, Mother and Son, House Husbands, The Leftovers, and Picnic at Hanging Rock. She is also a theatre performer, having worked with Australian theatre companies such as the Melbourne Theatre Company, the Sydney Theatre Company and the Tasmanian Theatre Company.

She was married to actor Richard Moir, and they had two daughters.

Filmography

FILM

TELEVISION

References

External links
 

1957 births
Living people
Australian television actresses
Actresses from Melbourne